Jervis Éarlson Drummond Johnson (born September 8, 1976 in Limón) is a Costa Rican former footballer who played as a right-back.

Club career
Drummond made his professional debut with Saprissa on 5 November 1995 against San Carlos and scored his first goal on 15 January 1997 against Herediano. He played his entire career for Saprissa, winning five national championships and two CONCACAF Champions Cups. He also played at the 2005 FIFA Club World Championship, where Saprissa finished third behind São Paulo and Liverpool. He played 452 league matches for Saprissa and 574 including cup and international matches.

In November 2010, Saprissa announced that Drummond would not play again for the club.

International career

Drummond played with his brother in the 1995 FIFA World Youth Championship in Qatar.

He made his debut for the Costa Rican senior team in a September 1995 friendly match against Jamaica and earned a total of 73 caps, scoring 1 goal. He represented his country in 19 FIFA World Cup qualification matches and was selected for the 2002 World Cup, but didn't play a single match. He played at the 2006 World Cup, at the 1999, 2003 and 2007 UNCAF Nations Cups, as well as at the 1998, 2002 and 2007 CONCACAF Gold Cups. He also played at the 2001 Copa América.

His final international was an August 2008 FIFA World Cup qualification against El Salvador.

International goals
Scores and results list Costa Rica's goal tally first.

Retirement
After retiring as a player, Drummond became manager at the Saprissa stadium restaurant.

Personal life
He is married to Laura Brenes. His twin brother, Gerald Drummond, also played for the national team and Saprissa.

References

External links
 

1976 births
Living people
People from Limón Province
Costa Rican twins
Twin sportspeople
Association football defenders
Costa Rican men's footballers
Costa Rica international footballers
1998 CONCACAF Gold Cup players
2001 Copa América players
2002 CONCACAF Gold Cup players
2002 FIFA World Cup players
2003 UNCAF Nations Cup players
2006 FIFA World Cup players
2007 UNCAF Nations Cup players
2007 CONCACAF Gold Cup players
Deportivo Saprissa players
Copa Centroamericana-winning players
Central American Games gold medalists for Costa Rica
Central American Games medalists in football